Ilya Muromets , or Ilya of Murom, sometimes Ilya Murometz, is one of the bogatyrs (epic knights) in Bylinas of Kievan Rus.
He is often featured alongside fellow bogatyrs Dobrynya Nikitich and Alyosha Popovich.

The tales are set in the time of the Kievan Rus'. Attempts have been made to identify a possible historical nucleus for the character. 
His relics are preserved in the Kyiv Monastery of the Caves (Kyiv, now modern Ukraine).

Ilya in byliny
Ilya Muromets is a major figure in the byliny, Russian epic folklore collected in the 18th and 19th centuries.
Ilya is the son of a farmer, was born in a village near Murom. He suffered a serious illness in his youth and was unable to walk until the age of 33. He could only lie on a Russian stove, until he was miraculously healed by two pilgrims. He was then given super-human strength by a dying knight – Svyatogor – and set out to liberate the city of Kiev from Idolishche to serve Prince Vladimir the Fair Sun (Vladimir Krasnoye Solnyshko). Along the way he single-handedly defended the city of Chernigov (modern day Ukrainian Chernihiv) from nomadic invasion (possibly by the Polovtsi) and was offered knighthood by the local ruler, but Ilya declined to stay. In the forests of Bryansk he then killed the forest-dwelling monster Nightingale the Robber (Solovei-Razboinik), who murdered travelers with his powerful whistle.

In Kiev, Ilya was made chief bogatyr by Prince Vladimir and he defended Rus' from numerous attacks by the steppe people, including , the (mythical) tsar of the Golden Horde. Generous and simple-minded but also temperamental, Ilya once went on a rampage and destroyed all the church steeples in Kiev after Prince Vladimir failed to invite him to a celebration. He was soon appeased when Vladimir sent for him.

Ilya Pechersky

It is generally believed that Muromets's prototype was Venerable Ilya Pechersky, a monastic saint of the  Orthodox Church, beatified in 1643. According to hagiography, before taking his monastic vows Ilya was a warrior famous for his strength. His nickname was Chobotok, Old East Slavic for "(small) boot", given to him after an incident when Ilya, caught by surprise, fought off enemies with only his boot.

In 1988, Soviet archeologists exhumed Ilya Chobotok's remains, stored in Kyiv Pechersk Lavra, and studied them. Their report suggested that at least some parts of the legend may be true: the man was tall, and his bones carried signs of spinal disease at early age and marks from numerous wounds, one of which was fatal.

Legendary status 

Ilya Muromets's name became a synonym of an outstanding physical and spiritual power and integrity, dedicated to the protection of the Homeland and People. Over time he became a hero of numerous movies, pictures, monuments, cartoons and anecdotes.  He is the only epic hero canonized by the Russian Orthodox Church.

Although the remains of Ilya Muromets are supposedly stored in Kyiv Pechersk Monastery, his character probably does not represent a unique historical persona, but rather a fusion of multiple real or fictional heroes from vastly different epochs. Thus Ilya supposedly served Prince Vladimir of Kiev (ruled 980–1015); he fought Batu Khan, the founder of Golden Horde (c. 1205–55); he saved Constantine the God-Loving, the tsar of Constantinople, from a monster (there were a number of Byzantine emperors named Constantine, one of them a contemporary of Prince Vladimir, named Constantine VIII; it could also be a reference to Constantine VII Porphyrogennetos, who encountered Olga of Kiev in the 950s; but the one Emperor in Constantinople with this name most likely to be called "God-loving" was Constantine XI).

Analysis
The cycle of tales around Ilya Muromets (including the fight against villainous Nightingale the Robber and monster Idolishche) is classified under its own type in the East Slavic Folktale Classification: SUS -650C*, closely placed with other tale types about strong heroes. The East Slavic Classification registers variants from Russian, Belarusian and Ukrainian sources.

Ilya Muromets depictions
 Catterino Cavos's 1807 opera Ilya Bogatyr (Ilya the Hero)
 Viktor Vasnetsov's 1898 painting Bogatyrs (center figure).
 Nicholas Roerich's 1910 painting Ilya Muromets
 Reinhold Glière's 1911 Symphony No. 3 (Ilya Muromets) in B minor, op. 42
 Ilya Muromets is depicted on the 1913 Russian stamp.
 Viktor Vasnetsov's 1914 painting Ilya Muromets.
 Ahmadu Ingawa's popular novella Iliya Danmaikarfi, published in Hausa language in 1951 by Gaskiya Corporation, Zaria, Nigeria, is based entirely on the Ilya Muromets legend.
 Aleksandr Ptushko's 1956 live action film Ilya Muromets (known in the U.S. as The Sword and the Dragon).
 Konstantin Vasilyev's 1974 and 1977 paintings.
 Ilya Muromets: the Prologue (1975) and Ilya Muromets and Nightingale the Robber (1978), a duology of animated shorts by Ivan Aksenchuk.
 French writer Antoine Volodine, writing under the pseudonym Elli Kronauer, reinvented the character in "Ilia Mouromietz et le rossignol brigand" (1999), the first of a series of books dedicated to the heroes of Russian byliny.
 Liz Williams' Nine Layers of Sky (2003) writes a modern-day account of Ilya.
 Juraj Červenák's historic fiction Bogatyr trilogy (2006–2008).
 The Three Bogatyrs (2004-ongoing), an animated movie franchise by Melnitsa studio.
 Ilya Muromets (June 2016), The Russian Navy christened its first new military icebreaker in 45 years with the name.

References

External links

 Ilya Muromets at Tradestone Gallery's Russian Fairy Tales gallery
 The evolution of Christianity, X. The History of Russia in the Context of the Evolution of the National Spirit and Orthodoxy
 "The Sword and the Dragon" (1960) is the American English-dubbed version of Ptushko's 1956 film, "Ilya Murometz"

Russian folklore characters
Characters in Bylina
Russian knights
Burials at the Near Caves, Kyiv Pechersk Lavra
People from Murom
Russian saints
Medieval legends